Kisvárda is a district in northern part of Szabolcs-Szatmár-Bereg County. Kisvárda is also the name of the town where the district seat is found. The district is located in the Northern Great Plain Statistical Region. This district is a part of Rétköz and Nyírség geographical region.

Geography 
Kisvárda District borders with Záhony District to the north, Vásárosnamény District to the east, Baktalórántháza District to the south, Kemecse District and Ibrány District to the west, Cigánd District (Borsod-Abaúj-Zemplén County) to the northwest. The number of the inhabited places in Kisvárda District is 23.

Municipalities 
The district has 3 towns and 20 villages.
(ordered by population, as of 1 January 2013)

The bolded municipalities are cities.

Demographics

In 2011, it had a population of 56,114 and the population density was 107/km².

Ethnicity
Besides the Hungarian majority, the main minorities are the Roma (approx. 3,500), Ukrainian (200), Russian and German (100).

Total population (2011 census): 56,114
Ethnic groups (2011 census): Identified themselves: 54,880 persons:
Hungarians: 50,963 (92.86%)
Gypsies: 3,250 (5.92%)
Others and indefinable: 667 (1.22%)
Approx. 1,500 persons in Kisvárda District did not declare their ethnic group at the 2011 census.

Religion
Religious adherence in the county according to 2011 census:

Reformed – 23,908;
Catholic – 20,817 (Roman Catholic – 13,770; Greek Catholic – 7,046);
Evangelical – 77;
other religions – 844;
Non-religious – 1,888; 
Atheism – 117;
Undeclared – 8,463.

Gallery

See also
List of cities and towns of Hungary

References

External links
 Postal codes of the Kisvárda District

Districts in Szabolcs-Szatmár-Bereg County